Lachnaia is a genus of leaf beetles in the subfamily Cryptocephalinae, tribe Clytrini. Multiple species in this genus are known to be myrmecophiles, such as the larvae of L. italica.

Species
Lachnaia caprai Grasso, 1958
Lachnaia cylindrica (Lacordaire, 1848)
Lachnaia hirta (Fabricius, 1801)
Lachnaia italica Weise, 1881
Lachnaia orientalis Weise, 1881
Lachnaia paradoxa (GA Olivier, 1808)
Lachnaia pseudobarathraea K. Daniel & J. Daniel, 1898
Lachnaia pubescens (Dufour, 1820)
Lachnaia puncticollis Chevrolat, 1840
Lachnaia sexpunctata (Scopoli, 1763)
Lachnaia tristigma (Lacordaire, 1848)
Lachnaia variolosa (Linnaeus, 1767)
Lachnaia zoiai Regalin, 1997

References

Clytrini
Chrysomelidae genera
Taxa named by Louis Alexandre Auguste Chevrolat